GeForce Now (stylized as GeForce NOW) is the brand used by Nvidia for its cloud gaming service. The Nvidia Shield version of GeForce Now, formerly known as Nvidia Grid, launched in beta in 2013, with Nvidia officially unveiling its name on September 30, 2015. The subscription service provided users with unlimited access to a library of games hosted on Nvidia servers for the life of the subscription, being delivered to subscribers through streaming video. Certain titles were also available via a "Buy & Play" model. This version was discontinued in 2019, and transitioned to a new version of the service that enabled Shield users to play their own games. 

In January 2017, Nvidia unveiled GeForce Now clients for Windows and Mac computers, available in North America and Europe as a free beta. GeForce NOW lets users access a virtual computer, where they can install their existing games from existing digital distribution platforms, and play them remotely. As with the original Shield version, the virtual desktop is also streamed from Nvidia servers. An Android client was also introduced in 2019.

The service exited Beta and launched to the general public on February 4, 2020. It is available on Windows, macOS, Android, iOS, Shield TV, Chromebook, Tizen and WebOS devices, The technology that powers Geforce NOW was invented by Franck Diard, and Xun Wang. The patent is owned by Nvidia.

Features 
GeForce Now consists of a network of servers based in data centers in North America and Europe, that host and serve the GeForce Now game library to members in those regions. On March 18, 2021, NVIDIA announced that they will be opening a datacenter in Montreal, Canada, in addition to two datacenters in Australia through their partnership with Pentanet. The servers utilize Nvidia Tesla graphics cards, and can stream games at up to 4K resolution at 60 frames per second or 1440p at 120 fps. Nvidia recommended a 50 Mbit/s internet connection for the 1080/60p stream, but the service can also stream at 720p/60p for 25 Mbit/s connections, 720/30p frames per second for connections higher than 10 Mbit/s, and use adaptive bitrate streaming to scale the quality based on bandwidth. The server-side hardware will be upgraded over time to improve the quality of the streams.

Library 
The original GeForce Now library on Shield contained over 80 games as of March 2016; at the Game Developers Conference 2016, Nvidia announced new licensing deals with Sega and Warner Bros. Interactive Entertainment. A large amount of the service's library was available for streaming with a subscription. Some games were available as a "Buy & Play" title only, under which users have to purchase the title in order to access it. This library has since been replaced with a "bring your own games" model, which is consistent with GeForce Now for Windows, Macintosh, and Android. For example, if a user wants to play Fortnite on a device, it would be free as the game itself is free to play, but to play Cyberpunk 2077, the user would need to sign into a Steam or Epic Games Store account that owns that game.

Nvidia has been involved in a number of licensing rights disputes related to games on the service, especially in February and March 2020 when the service transitioned from its beta stage to its general release. Activision Blizzard pulled all their games from the service in February 2020, citing a "misunderstanding" on the terms. Bethesda pulled the majority of its games shortly afterward. The developers of The Long Dark said that their game was improperly placed on the service without any sort of licensing agreement; Nvidia agreed to remove that game as well. In the beginning of March 2020, 2K Games also pulled their products from the service.

Nvidia announced in May 2020 that they would change their approach to have developers and publishers require their games to be opted into use for the library on the GeForce Now service, starting in June 2020, though this will be a free service offered to these companies. Shortly afterwards, Valve announced that it was launching a beta of its Steam Cloud Play services for its storefront that would integrate with other cloud gaming services, including GeForce Now.

On September 30, 2021, GeForce Now announced that Electronic Arts games, including Battlefield, Mirror's Edge Catalyst, Unravel, and Dragon Age franchises, are available to play in the cloud.

As of January 2022, GeForce NOW supports over 1500 games.

GeForce Now for computers 
At the Consumer Electronics Show in January 2017, Nvidia announced a version of GeForce Now for Windows and Macintosh computers. Unlike the version for Nvidia Shield (which Nvidia promoted as being similar to Netflix), this is a separate offering in which users can rent access to a remote desktop with access to a Windows environment with GeForce GTX graphics. Users can install digital distribution clients such as Steam onto the remote desktop to download and run purchased or free-to-play games as they would locally. One potential pricing structure is per-minute of play time using blocks of service credits; two price tiers would be available, with GTX 1060 and GTX 1080-class performance respectively. Nvidia aimed this service towards users who want to play their own purchased games on computers that are not compatible with them, such as laptops and computers with low-end capabilities. This pricing structure was never introduced. Instead, Nvidia revealed two membership options – Free and Founder's – on February 4, 2020, when GeForce Now officially ended its beta period. 

On March 18, 2021, GeForce Now changed the membership options to Free and Priority. In addition to the change of memberships options, GeForce Now also announced any one who had purchased the Founders membership, on or before March 17, 2021, would automatically given Founders for Life membership, which would continue at $4.99/month so long as membership was kept live. On October 21, 2021, Geforce Now added their RTX 3080 subscription service, which includes Data centers running on the newest RTX 3080 graphics cards. 

Nvidia announced a planned beta of the service in March 2017, but it was silently cancelled. In an earnings report in May 2017, Nvidia CEO Jen-Hsun Huang revealed that a beta would be held "sometime soon", but that the company was "still years away from being able to find the right balance between cost and quality of service and the pervasiveness of virtualizing a gaming PC." In late October 2017, Nvidia launched a free and open beta of the service limited to the Macintosh platform for English users in North America and Europe. In January 2018, Nvidia added PCs to the GeForce Now service, and, on February 4, 2020, the service was launched to the general public with generally positive reviews compared to rival streaming service Stadia.

References 

Nvidia products
Cloud gaming services
Subscription video game services
2015 introductions